

(E000) External cause status
  External cause status
  Civilian activity done for income or pay
  Military activity
  Volunteer activity
  Other external cause status
  Unspecified external cause status

(E001–E030) Activity
  Activities involving walking and running
  Activities involving water and water craft
  Activities involving snow and ice
  Activities involving climbing, rappelling and jumping off
  Activities involving dancing and other rhythmic movement
  Activities involving other sports and athletics played individually
  Activities involving other sports and athletics played as a team or group
  Activities involving other specified sports and athletics
  Activity involving other cardiorespiratory exercise
  Activity involving other muscle strengthening exercises
  Activities involving computer technology and electronic devices
  Activities involving arts and handcrafts
  Activities involving personal hygiene and household maintenance
  Activities involving person providing caregiving
  Activities involving food preparation, cooking and grilling
  Activities involving property and land maintenance, building and construction
  Activities involving roller coasters and other types of external motion
  Activities involving playing musical instrument
  Activities involving animal care
  Other activity
  Unspecified activity

(E800–E807) Railway accidents
  Railway accident involving collision with rolling stock
  Railway accident involving collision with other object

Excludes: Collision with: aircraft (E840-E842) or motor vehicle (E810.-, E820-E822)
  Railway accident involving derailment without antecedent collision
  Railway accident involving explosion, fire, or burning

Excludes: Explosion or fire, with mention of antecedent collision (E800.-, E801.-), explosion or fire, with antecedent derailment (E802.-)
  Fall in, on, or from railway train

Excludes: Fall related to collision, derailment, or explosion of railway train (E800-E803)
  Hit by rolling stock

Includes: Knocked down, run over, crushed; injured of killed by railway train or part of it
Excludes: Pedestrian hit by object set in motion by railway train (E806.-)
  Other specified railway accident

Includes: Hit by object falling in railway train; injured by door or window on railway train; non-motor road vehicle or pedestrian hit by object set in motion by railway train; or railway train hit by falling object (earth, rock tree etc.)
Excludes: Railway accident due to cataclysm (E908-E909)
  Railway accident of unspecified nature

(E810–E819) Motor vehicle traffic accidents
  Motor vehicle traffic accident involving collision with train
  Motor vehicle traffic accident involving re-entrant collision with another motor vehicle
  Other motor vehicle traffic accident involving collision with motor vehicle
  Motor vehicle traffic accident involving collision with other vehicle
  Motor vehicle traffic accident involving collision with pedestrian
  Other motor vehicle traffic accident involving collision on the highway
  Motor vehicle traffic accident due to loss of control without collision on the highway
  Noncollision motor vehicle traffic accident while boarding or alighting
  Other noncollision motor vehicle traffic accident
  Motor vehicle traffic accident of unspecified nature

(E820–E825) Motor vehicle non-traffic accidents
  Nontraffic accident involving motor-driven snow vehicle
  Nontraffic accident involving other off-road motor vehicle
  Other motor vehicle nontraffic accident involving collision with moving object
  Other motor vehicle nontraffic accident involving collision with stationary object
  Other motor vehicle nontraffic accident while boarding and alighting
  Other motor vehicle nontraffic accident of other and unspecified nature

(E826–E829) Other road vehicle accidents
  Pedal cycle accident
  Pedal cycle accident injuring pedestrian
  Pedal cycle accident injuring pedal cyclist
  Pedal cycle accident injuring rider of animal
  Pedal cycle accident injuring occupant of animal-drawn vehicle
  Pedal cycle accident injuring occupant of streetcar
  Pedal cycle accident injuring other specified person
  Pedal cycle accident injuring unspecified person
  Animal-drawn vehicle accident
  Animal-drawn vehicle accident injuring pedestrian
  Animal-drawn vehicle accident injuring rider of animal
  Animal-drawn vehicle accident injuring occupant of animal drawn vehicle
  Animal-drawn vehicle accident injuring occupant of streetcar
  Animal-drawn vehicle accident injuring other specified person
  Animal-drawn vehicle accident injuring unspecified person
  Accident involving animal being ridden
  Accident involving animal being ridden injuring pedestrian
  Accident involving animal being ridden injuring rider of animal
  Accident involving animal being ridden injuring occupant of streetcar
  Accident involving animal being ridden injuring other specified person
  Accident involving animal being ridden injuring unspecified person
  Other road vehicle accidents
  Other road vehicle accidents injuring pedestrian
  Other road vehicle accidents injuring occupant of streetcar
  Other road vehicle accidents injuring other specified person
  Other road vehicle accidents injuring unspecified person

(E830–E838) Water transport accidents
  Accident to watercraft causing submersion
  Accident to watercraft causing submersion injuring occupant of small boat, unpowered
  Accident to watercraft causing submersion injuring occupant of small boat, powered
  Accident to watercraft causing submersion injuring occupant of other watercraft—crew
  Accident to watercraft causing submersion injuring occupant of other watercraft—other than crew
  Accident to watercraft causing submersion injuring water skier
  Accident to watercraft causing submersion injuring swimmer
  Accident to watercraft causing submersion injuring dockers, stevedores
  Accident to watercraft causing submersion, occupant of military watercraft, any type
  Accident to watercraft causing submersion injuring other specified person
  Accident to watercraft causing submersion injuring unspecified person
  Accident to watercraft causing other injury
  Accident to watercraft causing other injury to occupant of small boat, unpowered
  Accident to watercraft causing other injury to occupant of small boat, powered
  Accident to watercraft causing other injury to occupant of other watercraft—crew
  Accident to watercraft causing other injury to occupant of other watercraft—other than crew
  Accident to watercraft causing other injury to water skier
  Accident to watercraft causing other injury to swimmer
  Accident to watercraft causing other injury to dockers, stevedores
  Accident to watercraft causing other injury, occupant of military watercraft, any type
  Accident to watercraft causing other injury to other specified person
  Accident to watercraft causing other injury to unspecified person
  Other accidental submersion or drowning in water transport accident
  Fall on stairs or ladders in water transport
  Other fall from one level to another in water transport
  Other and unspecified fall in water transport
  Machinery accident in water transport
  Explosion fire or burning in watercraft
  Other and unspecified water transport accident

(E840–E845) Air and space transport accidents
  Accident to powered aircraft at takeoff or landing
  Accident to powered aircraft at takeoff or landing, injuring occupant of aircraft
  Accident to powered aircraft at takeoff or landing, injuring any occupant of military aircraft
  Accident to powered aircraft at takeoff or landing, injuring crew of commercial aircraft (powered) in surface to surface transport
  Accident to powered aircraft at takeoff or landing, injuring other occupant of commercial aircraft (powered) in surface to surface transport
  Accident to spacecraft, injuring occupant of spacecraft

Note excludes effects of weightlessness in spacecraft (see E928.0)
  Accident to spacecraft, injuring groundcrew
  Accident to spacecraft, injuring other person

(E846–E848) Vehicle accidents not elsewhere classifiable
  Accidents involving powered vehicles used solely within the buildings and premises of industrial or commercial establishments
  Accidents involving cable cars not running on rails
  Accidents involving other vehicles, not elsewhere classifiable

(E849) Place of Occurrence
  Place of occurrence at Home
  Place of occurrence at Farm
  Place of occurrence at Mine and/or Quarry
  Place of occurrence at Industrial Premises
  Place of occurrence at Recreation/Sport
  Place of occurrence at Street and Highway
  Place of occurrence at Public building
  Place of occurrence at Residential institution
  Place of occurrence at Other specified places
  Place of occurrence at Unspecified place
  Place of occurrence at home

(E850–E858) Accidental poisoning by drugs, medicinal substances, and biologicals
  Accidental poisoning by analgesics antipyretics and antirheumatics
  Accidental poisoning by barbiturates
  Accidental poisoning by other sedatives and hypnotics
  Accidental poisoning by tranquilizers
  Accidental poisoning by other psychotropic agents
  Accidental poisoning by other drugs acting on central and autonomic nervous system
  Accidental poisoning by antibiotics
  Accidental poisoning by other anti-infectives
  Accidental poisoning by other drugs

(E860–E869) Accidental poisoning by other solid and liquid substances, gases, and vapors

(E870–E876) Misadventures to patients during surgical and medical care

(E878–E879) Surgical and medical procedures as the cause of abnormal reaction of patient or later complication, without mention of misadventure at the time of procedure

(E880–E888) Accidental falls
  Fall on same level from slipping, tripping or stumbling

(E890–E899) Accidents caused by fire and flames

(E900–E909) Accidents due to natural and environmental factors
  Venomous animals and plants as the cause of poisoning and toxic reactions
  Venomous snakes and lizards causing poisoning and toxic reactions
  Venomous spiders causing poisoning and toxic reactions
  Scorpion sting causing poisoning and toxic reactions
  Sting of hornets wasps and bees causing poisoning and toxic reactions
  Centipede and venomous millipede (tropical) bite causing poisoning and toxic reactions
  Other venomous arthropods causing poisoning and toxic reactions
  Venomous marine animals and plants causing poisoning and toxic reactions
  Poisoning and toxic reactions caused by other plants
  Poisoning and toxic reactions caused by other specified animals and plants
  Poisoning and toxic reactions caused by unspecified animals and plants
  Other injury caused by animals
  Dog bite
  Rat bite
  Bite of nonvenomous snakes and lizards
  Bite of other animal except arthropod
  Bite of nonvenomous arthropod
  Bite by unspecified animal
  Other specified injury caused by animal
  Unspecified injury caused by animal

(E910–E915) Accidents caused by submersion, suffocation, and foreign bodies
  Accidental drowning and submersion
  Inhalation and ingestion of food causing obstruction of respiratory tract or suffocation
  Inhalation and ingestion of other object causing obstruction of respiratory tract or suffocation
  Accidental mechanical suffocation
  Foreign body accidentally entering eye and adnexa
  Foreign body accidentally entering other orifice

(E916–E928) Other accidents
  Struck accidentally by falling object
  Striking against or struck accidentally by objects or persons
  Caught accidentally in or between objects
  Accidents caused by machinery
  Accidents caused by cutting and piercing instruments or objects
  Accident caused by explosion of pressure vessel
  Accident caused by firearm and air gun missile
  Accident caused by explosive material
  Accident caused by hot substance or object, caustic or corrosive material, and steam
  Accident caused by electric current
  Exposure to radiation
  Overexertion and strenuous and repetitive movements or loads
  Overexertion from sudden strenuous movement
  Overexertion from prolonged static position
  Excessive physical exertion from prolonged activity
  Cumulative trauma from repetitive motion
  Cumulative trauma from repetitive impact
  Other overexertion and strenuous and repetitive movements or loads
  Unspecified overexertion and strenuous and repetitive movements or loads

(E929) Late effects of accidental injury
  Late effects of accidental injury
  Late effects of motor vehicle accident
  Late effects of other transport accident
  Late effects of accidental poisoning
  Late effects of accidental fall
  Late effects of accident caused by fire
  Late effects of accident due to natural and environmental factors
  Late effects of other accidents
  Late effects of unspecified accident

(E930–E949) Drugs, medicinal and biological substances causing adverse effects in therapeutic use
  Antibiotics causing adverse effects in therapeutic use
  Other anti-infectives causing adverse effects in therapeutic use
  Hormones and synthetic substitutes causing adverse effects in therapeutic use
  Primarily systemic agents causing adverse effects in therapeutic use
  Agents primarily affecting blood constituents causing adverse effects in therapeutic use
  Analgesics antipyretics and antirheumatics causing adverse effects in therapeutic use
  Anticonvulsants and anti-parkinsonism drugs causing adverse effects in therapeutic use
  Sedatives and hypnotics causing adverse effects in therapeutic use
  Other central nervous system depressants and anesthetics causing adverse effects in therapeutic use
  Psychotropic agents causing adverse effects in therapeutic use
  Central nervous system stimulants causing adverse effects in therapeutic use
  Drugs primarily affecting the autonomic nervous system causing adverse effects in therapeutic use
  Agents primarily affecting the cardiovascular system causing adverse effects in therapeutic use
  Agents primarily affecting gastrointestinal system causing adverse effects in therapeutic use
  Water mineral and uric acid metabolism drugs causing adverse effects in therapeutic use
  Agents primarily acting on the smooth and skeletal muscles and respiratory system causing adverse effects in therapeutic use
  Agents primarily affecting skin and mucous membrane ophthalmological otorhinolaryngological and dental drugs causing adverse effects in therapeutic use
  Other and unspecified drugs and medicinal substances causing adverse effects in therapeutic use
  Bacterial vaccines causing adverse effects in therapeutic use
  Other vaccines and biological substances causing adverse effects in therapeutic use

(E950–E959) Suicide and self-inflicted injury
  Suicide and self-inflicted poisoning by solid or liquid substances
  Suicide and self-inflicted poisoning by gases in domestic use
  Suicide and self-inflicted poisoning by other gases and vapors
  Suicide and self-inflicted injury by hanging, strangulation, and suffocation
  Suicide and self-inflicted injury by submersion (drowning)
  Suicide and self-inflicted injury by firearms, air guns and explosives
  Suicide and self-inflicted injury by cutting and piercing instrument
  Suicide and self-inflicted injury by jumping from high places
  Suicide and self-inflicted injury by other and unspecified means
  Late effects of self-inflicted injury

(E960–E969) Homicide and injury purposely inflicted by other persons
  Fight brawl rape
  Assault by corrosive or caustic substance, except poisoning
  Assault by poisoning
  Assault by hanging and strangulation
  Assault by submersion [drowning]
  Assault by firearms and explosives
  Assault by cutting and piercing instrument
  Perpetrator of child and adult abuse
  Assault by other and unspecified means
  Late effects of injury purposely inflicted by other person

(E970–E978) Legal intervention
  Injury due to legal intervention by firearms
  Injury due to legal intervention by explosives
  Injury due to legal intervention by gas
  Injury due to legal intervention by blunt object
  Injury due to legal intervention by cutting and piercing instrument
  Injury due to legal intervention by other specified means
  Injury due to legal intervention by unspecified means
  Late effects of injuries due to legal intervention
  Legal execution

(E979) Terrorism

(E980–E989) Injury undetermined whether accidentally or purposely inflicted

(E990–E999) Injury resulting from operations of war

V codes – Supplementary classification of factors influencing health status and contact with health services
 – Persons with potential health hazards related to communicable diseases
 V01 Contact with or exposure to communicable diseases
 V02 Carrier or suspected carrier of infectious diseases
 V03 Need for prophylactic vaccination and inoculation against bacterial diseases
 V04 Need for prophylactic vaccination and inoculation against certain viral diseases
 V05 Need for other prophylactic vaccination and inoculation against single diseases
 V06 Need for prophylactic vaccination and inoculation against combinations of diseases
 – Persons with need for isolation, Other potential health hazards and Prophylactic measures
 V07 Need for isolation and other prophylactic measures
 V08 [Asymptomatic] human immunodeficiency virus (HIV) infection status
 V09 Infection with drug-resistant microorganisms
 – Persons with potential health hazards related to personal and family history
 V10 Personal history of malignant neoplasm (i.e. cancer)
 V11 Personal history of mental disorder
 V12 Personal history of certain other diseases
 V13 Personal history of other diseases
 V14 Personal history of allergy to medicinal agents
 V15 Other personal history presenting hazards to health
 V16 Family history of malignant neoplasm
 V17 Family history of certain chronic disabling diseases
 V18 Family history of certain other specific conditions
 V19 Family history of other conditions
 – Persons encountering health services in Circumstances related to Reproduction and development
 V20 Health supervision of infant or child
 V21 Constitutional states in development
 V22 Normal pregnancy
 V23 Supervision of high-risk pregnancy
 V24 Postpartum care and examination
 V25 Encounter for contraceptive management
 V26 Procreative management
 V27 Outcome of delivery
 V28 Encounter for [antenatal] screening of mother
 V29 Observation and evaluation of newborns for suspected conditions not found
 – Live-born infants according to type of birth
 V30 Single liveborn
 V31 Twin birth mate liveborn
 V32 Twin birth mate stillborn
 V33 Twin birth unspecified whether mate liveborn or stillborn
 V34 Other multiple birth (three or more) mates all liveborn
 V35 Other multiple birth (three or more) mates all stillborn
 V36 Other multiple birth (three or more) mates liveborn and stillborn
 V37 Other multiple birth (three or more) unspecified whether mates liveborn or stillborn
 V38 NOT USED
 V39 Liveborn unspecified whether single twin or multiple
 – Persons with a condition influencing their health status
 V40 Mental and behavioral problems
 V41 Problems with special senses and other special functions
 V42 Organ or tissue replaced by transplant
 V43 Organ or tissue replaced by other means
 V44 Artificial opening status
 V45 Other postprocedural states
 V46 Other dependence on machines
 V47 Other problems with internal organs
 V48 Problems with head neck and trunk
 V49 Other conditions influencing health status
 – Persons encountering health services for specific procedures and aftercare
 V50 Elective surgery for purposes other than remedying health states
 V51 Aftercare involving the use of plastic surgery
 V52 Fitting and adjustment of prosthetic device
 V53 Fitting and adjustment of other device
 V54 Other orthopedic aftercare
 V55 Attention to artificial openings
 V56 Encounter for dialysis and dialysis catheter care
 V57 Care involving use of rehabilitation procedures
 V58 Encounter for other and unspecified procedures and aftercare
 V59 Donors
 – Persons encountering health services in other circumstances
 V60 Housing, household and economic circumstances
 V61 Other family circumstances
 V62 Other psychosocial circumstances
 V63 Unavailability of other medical facilities for care
 V64 Persons encountering health services for specific procedures not carried out
 V65 Other persons seeking consultation
 V66 Convalescence and palliative care
 V67 Follow-up examination
 V68 Encounters for administrative purposes
 V69 Problems related to lifestyle
 – Persons without reported diagnosis encountered during examination and investigation of individuals and populations
 V70 General medical examination
 V71 Observation and evaluation for suspected conditions not found
 V72 Special investigations and examinations
 V73 Special screening examination for viral and chlamydial diseases
 V74 Special screening examination for bacterial and spirochetal diseases
 V75 Special screening examination for other infectious diseases
 V76 Special screening for malignant neoplasms
 V77 Special screening for endocrine nutritional metabolic and immunity disorders
 V78 Special screening for disorders of blood and blood-forming organs
 V79 Special screening for mental disorders and developmental handicaps
 V80 Special screening for neurological eye and ear diseases
 V81 Special screening for cardiovascular respiratory and genitourinary diseases
 V82 Special screening for other conditions
 – Genetics
 V83 Genetic carrier status
 V84 Genetic susceptibility to disease
  Body mass index
  Estrogen receptor Status
  Other Specified Personal Exposures And History Presenting Hazards To Health
  Acquired Absence of Other Organs And Tissue
  Other Suspected Conditions Not Found
  Retained Foreign Body
  Multiple Gestation Placenta Status

References

International Classification of Diseases